Zinc stearate is a "zinc soap" that is widely used industrially. In this context, soap is used in its formal sense, a metal salt of a fatty acid: in this case stearic acid. It is a white solid that repels water. It is insoluble in polar solvents such as alcohol and ether but soluble in aromatic hydrocarbons (e.g., benzene) and chlorinated hydrocarbons when heated. It is the most powerful mold release agent among all metal soaps. It contains no electrolyte and has a hydrophobic effect. Its main application areas are the plastics and rubber industry, where it is used as a releasing agent and lubricant which can be easily incorporated.

Zinc carboxylates, e.g. basic zinc acetate, adopt complex formulas, and are not simply dicarboxylates of zinc. Instead the formula for most zinc carboxylates is Zn4O(O2CR)6, consisting of a Zn4O6+ core with carboxylate ligands spanning the edges.

Applications
It is widely used as a release agent for the production of many kinds of objects: rubber, polyurethane, polyester processing system, powder metallurgy.  These applications exploit its "non-stick" properties. In cosmetics, zinc stearate is a lubricant and thickening agent used to improve texture.

It is an "activator" for accelerated rubber sulfur vulcanization.  As discovered in the early days of vulcanization, zinc has a beneficial effect on the reaction of the sulfur with the polyolefin.  The stearate is a form of zinc that is highly soluble in the nonpolar medium of the polyolefins.

Being lipophilic, it functions as a phase transfer catalyst for the saponification of fats.

Niche uses
It is a component of some paints, imparting  gloss.  As a chief ingredient in "fanning powder", it is used by magicians performing card manipulation to decrease the friction between playing cards.

References

Stearates
stearate